São Jorge de Arroios (English: Saint George in Arroios) is a former parish (freguesia) in the municipality of Lisbon, Portugal. With the administrative reorganization of Lisbon on 8 December 2012 it became part of the parish of Arroios.

Main sites
Sotto Mayor Palace

References 

Former parishes of Lisbon